Reeser is a family name that can refer to:

Autumn Reeser (born 1980), American actress
Esther Ann Reeser (1928-2014), All-American Girls Professional Baseball League player
Jeannie Reeser, American politician, member of the Colorado state legislature until 1998
Mary Reeser (1884-1951), American suspected victim of spontaneous human combustion
Morgan Reeser (born 1962), American Olympic Games medalist
Sara Reeser (born 1925), All-American Girls Professional Baseball League player
  

Surnames